Löffler (literally "Spooner") is a German language surname. It is often anglicised as Loeffler. In most cases, the name originates from people who produced and/or traded spoons (German: löffel). Notable people with the surname include:

 Anna Seelig-Löffler (born 1944), Swiss chemist
 August Löffler (1822–1866), German painter
 Charles Martin Loeffler (1861–1935), German-born American composer
 Cullen Loeffler (born 1981), American football player
 Diane Loeffler (1953–2019), American politician from Minnesota
 Douglas Loeffler (born 1932), American politician from Florida
 Frank Löffler (born 1980), German ski jumper
 Friedrich Löffler (1852–1915), German bacteriologist
 Gerold Löffler, Swiss bobsledder
 Karl Löffler, head of the Jewish Affairs department of the Gestapo in Cologne, Germany during the 1930s and 1940s
 Kelly Loeffler (born 1970), American businesswoman and politician
 Ken Loeffler (1902–1975), American basketball coach
 Leopold Loeffler (1827–1898), Polish painter
 Louis R. Loeffler (1897–1972), American film editor
 Louise Loeffler, Belgian chess master
 Margot Klestil-Löffler (born 1954), Austrian diplomat
 Pete Loeffler (born 1976), American guitarist and singer
 Scot Loeffler (born 1974), American football coach
 Tom Loeffler (born 1946), American politician from Texas
 Wilhelm Löffler (doctor) (born 1887), Swiss physician

See also 
 Löffler's syndrome
 Loeffler endocarditis

References

German-language surnames
Occupational surnames